Lapalang is a village in the East Khasi Hills district, Meghalaya, India. As per 2011 Census of India, Lapalang has a population of 4,292 people with a literacy rate of 76.47%.

There is a boys hostel of National Institute of Technology, Meghalaya, in the Lapalang village.

References 

Meghalaya